The pièze is the unit of pressure in the metre–tonne–second system of units (mts system), used, e.g., in the former Soviet Union 1933–1955. It is defined as one sthène per square metre.  The symbol is pz.

{|
|-
|rowspan=6 valign=top|one pièze||=
|align=right| 1 || kilopascal
|-
|=
|align=right| 10 || millibars
|-
|≈
|align=right|  || standard atmospheres
|-
|≈
|align=right|7.501 || torrs
|-
|≈
|align=right|0.1450 || pounds per square inch
|-
|≈
|align=right|0.2953 || inches of mercury
|}

References

Obsolete units of measurement
Units of pressure
Non-SI metric units
Metre–tonne–second system of units